GPANG (Korean: 지팡) was a 3D mobile game service introduced in 2004 by the Korean provider KTF. This service allowed subscribers to access a downloadable game portal and play advanced 3D mobile games, including MMOs. KTF's GPANG competed with SK Telecom's own 3D mobile game service called GXG. On June 1 2009, GPANG ceased to exist.

Compatible devices
LG KV3600 (2005)
Samsung SPH-G1000 (2005)
Samsung SPH-B3200 (2006)

Games
72 released games are known to exist, with 1 unreleased game.

See also
GXG
N-Gage

References

External links
GPANG Website 
New World MMO Store

Mobile software
Online video game services
Mobile software distribution platforms